Ariko is a Japanese female given name. Notable people with the name include:

, Japanese photographer
, Japanese football trainer
, was an Empress consort of Japan

Japanese feminine given names